Lauren Wells may refer to:

Lauren Wells (footballer) (born 1988), English footballer
Lauren Wells (hurdler) (born 1988), Australian track and field athlete